Estadio El Cobre is a multi-use stadium in El Salvador, Chile.  It is currently used mostly for football matches and is the home stadium of Cobresal.  The stadium holds 12,000 people, which is more than the population of the town it is in, and was built in 1980.

References

El Cobre
Sports venues in Atacama Region
Sports venues completed in 1980
1980 establishments in Chile